The List of Religious Cultural Monuments of Albania refers to a monument in Albania which has been recognized by the Government of Albania and Ministry of Culture as a religious national heritage monument and one which is seen as of top importance to the religious culture of the nation. These cultural monuments include places of worship, including mosques, churches and monasteries. As of 2010, there were 201 places of worship that have been designated as Religious Cultural Monuments.

List of places of worship designated as Religious Cultural Monuments of Albania

Berat County

Dibër County

Durrës County

Elbasan County

Fier County

Gjirokastër County

Korçë County

Kukës County

Lezhë County

Shkodër County

Tirana County

Vlorë County

See also
List of Bektashi tekkes and shrines
List of tekkes in Albania

References

Architecture in Albania
 
Lists of religious buildings and structures in Albania